Yaroslav Igorevich Krestovsky (February 9, 1925, Leningrad, USSR – 2003, Saint Petersburg, Russia) was a Soviet Russian painter, lived and worked in Leningrad - Saint Petersburg, regarded by art historian Sergei V. Ivanov as one of the representatives of the Leningrad school of painting.

Biography 
Krestovsky was born February 9, 1925, in Leningrad, USSR in family of well-known Leningrad sculptor Igor Krestovsky (1894—1976; see also: Портрет скульптора Игоря Крестовского), a professor of the Ilya Repin Institute. Yaroslav Krestovsky is a grandson of the famous Russian prose-writer Vsevolod Krestovsky (1840—1895), the author of the novel "The Slums of Saint Petersburg" (1864).

From 1937 till 1941 Yaroslav was studied at the Leningrad Secondary Art School at the All-Russian Academy of Arts. His teachers were Konstantyn Lepilov, Olga Bogaevskaya, Mikhail Natarevich. When the War was beginning Yaroslav with his family evacuated from Leningrad to Rostov the Great. After returning he entered to the painting department of the Leningrad Vera Mukhina Higher School of Art and Design. In the autumn of 1945 a tragic event happened with him: he lost an eye during a hunt. To save a colour sensing he had to change the painting department to the restoration one, which he graduated at 1948.

From 1948 till 1950 he worked as an artist-restorer of the wall-painting at the State restoration workshop.

Meanwhile, he began to attend the courses at the Ilya Repin Institute as an extern and in 1950 he entered to the Graphic Department of it. After 2 years he changed the Department into the Painting and in 1956 he graduated from Ilya Repin Institute in Mikhail Bobyshov workshop. His Diploma work were series of sketches to the scenery and costumes of an Nikolai Rimsky-Korsakov`s opera "Snegurochka"

Since 1957 Yaroslav Krestovsky has participated in Art Exhibitions. He painted cityscapes, portraits, still lifes, and genre paintings. 
Yaroslav Krestovsky was a member of Saint Petersburg Union of Artists (before 1992 Leningrad branch of Union of Artists of Russian Federation) since 1958.

In the 1960s, Yaroslav Krestovsky was a teacher of the Painting Department of the Leningrad Vera Mukhina Higher School of Art and Design.

He painted cityscapes and landscapes, still lifes, portraits, genre compositions. His manner especially took the form at the end of 1950s till the middle of 1970s.

He is an author of paintings: «Prionezhje. Kondopoga»[5] (1956), «Yachts», «White Night. Krukov Channel»[6] (both 1957), «Rostov», «Sunny Day in Leningrad[7], «Gryboedova Channel», «Fontanka. White Night», «Krukov Channe. Morning»[8] (all 1958), «Laundry Bridge», «At Vasylivsky Island»[9], «Court»[10][11] (all 1959), «Channel in the Morning», «White Night in Leningrad»[12] (both 1961), «Rosa. Portrait of Wife» (1962), «Fantasy on North Theme. Night»[13] (1963), «Frosty Day», «Evening. Baltyisky Factory», «Time of Sunrise. Fontanka»[14] (all 1964), «Still life with Mannequin»[15] (1965), «White Nights»[16] (1967), «Watchmakers»[17], «Dead Tree»[15] (both 1968), «Watchmaker. By the Motifs of Hoffmann`s Tales»[18], «Storm of Tychvin»[17] (1969), «Kursk Edge. Counteroffensive to Belgorod»[19], «Watch and Dolls»[15] (both 1972), «Turbine Construction shop»[20], «Pickers»[21] (1975), «An Hour before Sunrise»[22], «Thunderstorm», «Troubled White Night»[23], «Leningrad Motif»[22] (all 1977) и and many others.

Yaroslav Krestovsky was a participant of the Groupe "Eleven". The Exhibition of Eleven (Leningrad, 1972) artists (called later as the exhibition of "Eleven") was opened October 24, 1972 in Okhta  Exhibition Hall of the Union of Artists of the Russian Federation [25]. Another members of the Group were: artists  Valery Vatenin, German Yegoshin, Zaven Arshakuny, Boris Shamanov, Leonid Tkachenko, husband and wife Victor Teterin and Evgenia Antipova, Valentina Rakhina, a wife of German Yegoshin, Vitaly Tulenev and sculptor Konstantin Simun with support of art-critic Lev Mochalov. It showed the creation of the "left wing" of the Leningrad Union of Soviet Artists in concentration. The second exhibition was in 1976 at the same place and just 9 artists of 11 took part in it. In the future they demonstrated their art works in solo or in the big common exhibitions with two or tree participants in Moscow and Leningrad. In 1990 the members of "Eleven" engaged in the common exhibition of 26 Leningrad and Moscow artists in Central Exhibition Hall "Manezh" in Saint-Petersburg.

In 1970s the eyesight of Krestovsky suddenly began to fall, he couldn't paint from this time and late went blind. His last works dates by 1977.

His personal Exhibitions were in Leningrad (1983), Moscow (1986), Saint Petersburg (1995, 2000).
 
Yaroslav Igorevich Krestovsky died in Saint Petersburg on January 23, 2004. Paintings by Yaroslav Krestovsky are in State Russian Museum, State Tretyakov Gallery[26], in art museums and private collections in Russia, the United States, Japan, China, and throughout the world.

See also
 Leningrad School of Painting
 List of Russian artists
 List of 20th-century Russian painters
 List of painters of Saint Petersburg Union of Artists
 Saint Petersburg Union of Artists

References

Bibliography 
 Directory of members of the Leningrad branch of Union of Artists of Russian Federation. - Leningrad: Khudozhnik RSFSR, 1987. - p. 66.
 Серебряная В. Ярослав Игоревич Крестовский. Л., Художник РСФСР, 1987.
 Matthew C. Bown. Dictionary of 20th Century Russian and Soviet Painters 1900-1980s. - London: Izomar, 1998. , .
 Anniversary Directory graduates of Saint Petersburg State Academic Institute of Painting, Sculpture, and Architecture named after Ilya Repin, Russian Academy of Arts. 1915 - 2005. - Saint Petersburg: Pervotsvet Publishing House, 2007.- p. 76.  .
 Grigor'yants E. Yaroslav Krestovskiy // Allgemeines Künstlerlexikon. — Walter de Gruyter. Band 81 — 2013.

1925 births
2003 deaths
20th-century Russian painters
Russian male painters
21st-century Russian painters
Soviet painters
Members of the Leningrad Union of Artists
Socialist realist artists
Leningrad School artists
Repin Institute of Arts alumni
Saint Petersburg Stieglitz State Academy of Art and Design alumni
20th-century Russian male artists
21st-century Russian male artists